Endgame (stylized as ENDGAMƎ) is a Canadian drama television series that premiered on the Showcase Television network on Monday, March 14, 2011. The series was developed and produced by Thunderbird Films. The series followed fictional former World Chess Champion Arkady Balagan (Shawn Doyle), a genius who uses his analytical skills to solve crimes.

The show starts four months after the death of Balagan's fiancée Rosemary, when Balagan has developed agoraphobia. Balagan uses the faculties he honed playing chess to help him solve cases.

Cast and characters 
 Shawn Doyle as Arkady Balagan – a former world chess champion from Russia. While attending a world championship in Vancouver his fiancée, Rosemary, is killed by an assassin's gunfire in front of the hotel Huxley. His resultant agoraphobia makes him an "armchair detective" like Nero Wolfe or Lincoln Rhyme. Initially, he primarily makes money by charging exorbitant rates for games against "Grandmaster Arkady Balagan" on his website.
 Torrance Coombs as Sam Besht – a grad student and chess fanatic. He is Balagan's apprentice; because of Balagan's phobia Sam is the one who does the leg work to solve the cases. Sam is a smart kid with a promising future; Balagan pays Sam for his legwork by giving him more chances to play chess with Balagan.
 Patrick Gallagher as Hugo – the head of hotel security. He and Balagan have their disagreements; Hugo envies Balagan's superior capabilities solving crimes as a mere chess player while he, as a former detective, shows a lower aptitude at deduction.  Hugo constantly threatens Balagan about his inability to pay his bills, and wants him to leave. Balagan deceives and outwits Hugo into helping him or staying out of his way.
 Katharine Isabelle as Danni – a bartender at the hotel. Danni serves as a source of information.
 Melanie Papalia as Pippa – younger sister of Rosemary (Balagan's deceased fiancée), she is determined to find out who killed Rosemary. She makes documentaries and keeps a video blog.
 Carmen Aguirre as Alcina – a cleaning lady at the Huxley Hotel. She is a single mother of six, with one grandchild, who works overtime, practically every day. She sometimes skips work time in order to do some field work with Sam, as a favour to Mr. Balagan, who tips generously.
 Veena Sood as Barbara Stilwell – the manageress of the hotel. Barbara does not help with Balagan's cases.
 Collin Lawrence – as Homicide Detective Jason Evans (recurring), the newest detective assigned by the police to investigate the murder of Pippa's older sister Rosemary (Balagan's late fiancée). Pippa has confidence in the detective, and that his fresh perspective on the case will enable him to solve the mystery of who murdered Rosemary. Balagan, in sharp contrast, has much less faith in the police, based on his experiences in the Soviet Union with alleged corruption and incompetence.

Episodes

Cancellation 
In early June 2011 Showcase announced that it would not renew Endgame for a second season. In February 2012, it was reported that Shawn Doyle had been contracted for a possible return of the series, pending continued success of its Hulu premiere. In June 2012, it was announced that the show would not be continued.

Distribution 
The series is available through streaming services Amazon Video and Hulu. It is also available in the free with ads section of Vudu.

References

External links 

 
 

2010s Canadian crime drama television series
2011 Canadian television series debuts
2011 Canadian television series endings
Showcase (Canadian TV channel) original programming
Television series by Corus Entertainment
Television shows filmed in Vancouver
Television shows set in Vancouver
Television shows about chess